Vuillemin is a surname. Notable people with the surname include:

Alexandre Vuillemin (1812–1880), French cartographer
David Vuillemin (born 1977), French motorcycle racer
Jean Vuillemin, French computer scientist
Jean-Claude Vuillemin (born 1954), French-born liberal-arts research professor at Penn State U.
Jean Paul Vuillemin (1861–1932), French mycologist
Joseph Vuillemin (1883–1963), French aviator and air force general
Jules Vuillemin (1920–2001), French philosopher
Louis Vuillemin (1870–1929), French composer
Philippe Vuillemin (born 1958), French cartoonist

See also
Louis Vulliemin (1797–1879), Swiss theologian and historian